The French Press Institute (commonly referred to as "IFP") is a public institution of research and higher education, which has served as the department for communication and journalism studies at Panthéon-Assas University since 1970. Founded in 1937, the French Press Institute is the oldest and one of the finest French schools in the field of journalism and communication studies.

History

The establishment of the institute
Founded in 1937 in the Faculty of Law of Paris, the Institut des Sciences de la Presse (Press Sciences Institute) became the Institut français de presse in 1951. The French Press Institute is the first organization to have been dedicated to media studies.

After the war, owing to international partnerships, the French Press Institute became a leading international institute regarding media evolution studies. Its first director, Fernand Terrou, took part in the redaction of the declaration of Press rights of San Francisco in 1948 and formed a bond with the Institute for Communication Research of Stanford University. In 1957, with UNESCO, the French Press Institute supported the establishment of the International Association for Studies and Research on Information and Communication (IAMCR). After the division of the University of Paris in thirteen autonomous universities in 1970, the French Press Institute joined Panthéon-Assas University.

The directors of the institute 
 1951–1976: Fernand Terrou
 1976–1986: Francis Balle
 1986–1994: Pierre Albert
 1994–1999: Rémy Rieffel
 1999–2004: Nadine Toussaint-Desmoulins
 2004–2009: Josiane Jouët
 2009 – present: Nathalie Sonnac

See also
 Education in France
 Panthéon-Assas University

References

Sources
.

External links
 Official website

Grands établissements
Educational institutions established in 1937
Paris 2 Panthéon-Assas University
1937 establishments in France